Glenwood is a locality split between the Fraser Coast Region and the Gympie Region in Queensland, Australia.

Geography 
Glenwood is located about halfway between Gympie and Maryborough on the Bruce Highway.

History 
Glenwood Provisional School opened on 11 November 1918. On 1 December 1927 it became Glenwood State School.

Glenwood was part of the Shire of Tiaro until the local government amalgamations of 2008.

In the  the town had a population of 1,259.

Education 
Glenwood State School is a government primary (Prep-6) school for boys and girls at 13 Glenwood School Road. In 2017, the school had an enrolment of 83 students with 8 teachers (5 full-time equivalent) and 8 non-teaching staff (5 full-time equivalent).

There is no secondary school in Glenwood; the nearest ones are in Gympie.

Events 
Glenwood is a small town except on the third weekend in August when they hold their Swap Meet which is held at the Glenwood Hall. The Glenwood Community Centre run many events throughout the year at the Glenwood Hall.

References

External links

Towns in Queensland
Fraser Coast Region
Gympie Region
Localities in Queensland